Henry Norman Hodd (8 May 1905 – 25 April 1973) was the Archdeacon of Blackburn from 1962 until his death.

He was educated at St Peter's School, York and Keble College, Oxford. He began his ecclesiastical career as a Curate at Leeds Parish Church. After this he was Senior Curate at  Christ Church, Harrogate from 1932 to 1935; Vicar of the University Church, Leeds, 1935 to 1942; Chaplain to the Forces 1942 to 1945; Vicar and Rural Dean of Retford from 1945 to 1951; Vicar of  Mansfield from 1951 to 1959; and  Adviser on Christian Stewardship to the Church of England from 1959 to 1962 before his Archdeacon’s appointment.

References

1905 births
1973 deaths
People educated at St Peter's School, York
Alumni of Keble College, Oxford
Archdeacons of Blackburn